is a Japanese writer.  His father was Saburō Hirose, an architect.

Biography 
He was born in Tokyo.  After graduating from Waseda University, he started writing by translating foreign medical studies.  After the Three Mile Island accident in 1979, Hirose wrote several works about the event in the 1980s.  In his book, he argues that several outdoor film sets in Nevada in the 1950s were contaminated as a result of nuclear testing.  After the Chernobyl disaster, Hirose published , in which he makes an argument about the risks of using nuclear energy to generate electricity.

In addition to writing works criticising nuclear power, Hirose wrote several works on the economy of Japan as well as the world economy.  In 1986, he published , in which he focused on the Rockefeller and Morgan families.  He also published a work focusing on the Rothschild family, in 1991.  On Ryūichi Hirokawa's work concerning Judaism, Hirose claimed that it revealed several Jewish conspiracies, particularly among Israel, South Africa and Taiwan.

Concerning the Fukushima Daiichi nuclear disaster, Hirose suggested that Chief Cabinet Secretary Yukio Edano repeated the warnings given to him by Tokyo Electric Power Company about the health effects of the disaster.  He later wrote several works in which he called for a phase-out of nuclear power.  In 2012, a year since the accident, he gave a testimony for Beyond the Cloud, a film by Keiko Courdy concerning the event.

Selected bibliography 
  (1981)
  (1982)
  (1986)
  (1987)
  (1988)
  (1989)
  (1991)
  (1992)
  (2007)
  (2010)
  (2010)

See also 
 Anti-nuclear movement
 Nuclear power phase-out
 James Goldsmith

References 

1943 births
Living people
Antisemitism in Japan
Japanese left-wing activists
Japanese anti–nuclear power activists
Anti-Zionism in Japan
Japanese conspiracy theorists
Japanese male writers
Japanese non-fiction writers
Japanese translators
Waseda University alumni
Writers from Tokyo
Male non-fiction writers